Dorin Mateuț (born 2 August 1965) is a retired Romanian footballer who played as an offensive midfielder.

Club career
Mateuț was born in Bogata-Curtuiuș, Cluj County on 2 August 1965, but his birth was declared by his family to the authorities on 5 August 1965. He made his Divizia A on 14 October 1981 playing for Corvinul Hunedoara in a 3–1 victory against Olt Scornicești under coach Mircea Lucescu, a coach who he would also work with at Dinamo București and Brescia. After 5 seasons and a half in which he scored 36 goals in 132 Divizia A matches for Corvinul, helping the club finish 3rd in the 1981–82 Divizia A, also appearing in three games in which he scored one goal in the 1982–83 UEFA Cup, he was transferred in the middle of the 1986–87 season to Dinamo București. He scored an astounding 43 goals, only one from a penalty kick, to take the top goalscorer title and even the European Golden Boot in the 1988–89 season. In the following season Mateuț helped Dinamo win the league championship contributing with 9 goals scored in 22 matches, the Romanian cup in which he scored one goal in the final which ended with a 6–4 victory against Steaua București and he scored 4 goals in 8 matches as Dinamo reached the 1989–90 European Cup Winners' Cup semi-finals. After the 1989 Romanian Revolution, Mateuț went to play abroad, in Spain at La Liga club, Real Zaragoza. He retired after having spells in Italy at Serie A clubs, Brescia and Reggiana, had a comeback at Dinamo and ended his career at Sportul Studențesc where he made his last Divizia A appearance on 23 March 1996 in a 1–0 victory against Ceahlăul Piatra Neamț. Dorin Mateuț has a total of 281 Divizia A appearances in which he scored 134 goals and 25 games played with 12 goals scored in European competitions.

International career
Dorin Mateuț played 56 matches and scored 10 goals for Romania, making his debut on 7 February 1984 when coach Mircea Lucescu sent him on the field in the 81st minute in order to replace Aurel Țicleanu in a friendly which ended 1–1 against Algeria. In his following game, a friendly which ended with a 2–0 victory against Greece, Mateuț scored his first goal. He played four games, scoring one goal at the 1986 World Cup qualifiers, five games in which he scored one goal at the Euro 1988 qualifiers and 6 games in which he scored two goals at the successful 1990 World Cup qualifiers, also being part of the 1990 World Cup squad, playing in a group game against Argentina which ended 1–1. Mateuț's last game for the national team was a 1–1 against Bulgaria at the Euro 1992 qualifiers, where he appeared in a total of six games in which he scored two goals.

For representing his country at the 1990 World Cup, Mateuț was decorated by President of Romania Traian Băsescu on 25 March 2008 with the Ordinul "Meritul Sportiv" – (The Medal "The Sportive Merit") class III.

International goals
Scores and results list Romania's goal tally first, score column indicates score after each Mateuț goal.

Honours

Club
Dinamo București
Divizia A: 1989–90
Cupa României: 1989–90

Individual
Divizia A top scorer: 1989
Romanian Footballer of the Year: 1988
European Golden Shoe: 1989

References

External links
 
 

1965 births
Living people
Romanian footballers
Romania under-21 international footballers
Romania international footballers
CS Corvinul Hunedoara players
FC Dinamo București players
Real Zaragoza players
Brescia Calcio players
A.C. Reggiana 1919 players
FC Sportul Studențesc București players
Liga I players
La Liga players
Serie A players
Romanian expatriate footballers
Expatriate footballers in Spain
Expatriate footballers in Italy
1990 FIFA World Cup players
Association football midfielders
People from Cluj County